The Dominican Republic participated in the 2011 Parapan American Games.

Medalists

Athletics

The Dominican Republic will send eight male and two female athletes to compete.

Cycling

The Dominican Republic will send one male athlete to compete in the road cycling tournament.

Swimming

The Dominican Republic will send one male and one female swimmer to compete.

Nations at the 2011 Parapan American Games
2011 in Dominican Republic sport
Dominican Republic at the Pan American Games